Longtown railway station served the town of Longtown, Cumbria, England, from 1861 to 1970 on the Waverley Route.

History 
The station opened on 29 October 1861 by the North British Railway. The station was situated on the north side of the A7.  There was a goods yard to the north of the station and had five sidings in total; the fifth running to the end of a cattle dock. The siding at the rear of the yard served a coal and lime depot. A two road engine shed opened to the north side of the station on 15 October 1861 but closed in 1924 and was demolished shortly after. The station closed in 1969, although the line was still open for goods traffic to the army depot, until the station closed completely in 1970.

References 

Disused railway stations in Cumbria
Former North British Railway stations
Railway stations in Great Britain opened in 1861
Railway stations in Great Britain closed in 1969
Beeching closures in England